Didier Leclair (born Didier Kabagema, 1967 in Montreal) is a Canadian francophone fiction writer currently based in Toronto. He has lived in various countries in Africa, and has studied at Laurentian University in Sudbury and Toronto's Glendon College.

Awards and recognition
 2000: French-language winner, Trillium Book Award, Toronto, je t'aime
 2004: French-language fiction finalist, Governor General's Awards, Ce pays qui est le mien
 2011: French-language finalist, Trillium Book Award, Le soixantième parallèle
 2016: French-language finalist, Trillium Book Award, Pour l'amour de Dimitri
 2016: French-language winner, Christine Dimitriu Van Saanen Book Award, Pour l'amour de Dimitri
 2018: French-language finalist, Trillium Book Award, Le Bonheur est un parfum sans nom
 2019: English-language finalist, Toronto Book Award, This Country of mine (Translated work by Elaine Kennedy)

Bibliography
 2000: Toronto, je t'aime (Vermillon) 
 2003: Ce pays qui est le mien (Vermillon) 
 2007: Un passage vers l'Occident (Vermillon) 
 2010: Le soixantième parallèle (Vermillon) 
 2012: Le complexe de Trafalgar (Vermillon) 
 2014: "Un ancien d'Afrique", (Vermillon) 
 2015: "Pour l'amour de Dimitri", (Les Éd. David) 
 2017: "Le bonheur est un parfum sans nom", (Les Ed. David) 
 2019: Translation of Ce pays qui est le mien by Elaine Kennedy: This Country of Mine, (Deux Voiliers Pub.) 
 2019: "Le vieil homme sans voix", (Les Ed. David)

References

External links
 

1967 births
Living people
Canadian male novelists
Writers from Montreal
Writers from Toronto
Black Canadian writers
Canadian novelists in French
21st-century Canadian novelists
21st-century Canadian male writers
Glendon College alumni